Gaspare Carpegna (8 April 1625 – 6 May 1714) was an Italian Catholic Cardinal.

Early life

Gaspare was born in 1625 in Rome. His mother was from the Spada family. He was a relative of the Cardinal Ulderico Carpegna of the Holy Roman Catholic Church who died in 1679. He was born in Rome on 8 May 1625, in the family of the Counts of Carpegna, the Montefeltro. The mother was a descendant of the aristocratic Spada family.

Ecclesiastic career
He was indirectly linked to Pope Clement X Altieri, since the pope's nephew had married Carpegna's sister. This pope elevated him to the rank of cardinal in the consistory of 1670. He was made a cardinal on 29 December 1670. He was known for assembling a large library, as well as a medallion and coin collection. On 8 August 1671, Clement X appointed him cardinal vicar, when he had to replace Cardinal Paluzzo degli Albertoni Altieri, who had been adopted into the Altieri family. Cardinal Carpegna firmly held the vicarage until death, for over forty years, well below the following five popes: Clement X, Innocent XI, Pope Alexander VIII, Innocent XII, and Clement XI.

He was an influential member of the Curia, and associated with numerous congregations. He was a member of the cultural Arcadia Society in 1695, skilled in court maneuvers, very severe in repressing abuses, and also attempted to gain the papacy in the Conclave of 1689, which ended up elevating Alexander VIII Ottoboni. The hostility of France and the Grand Duchy of Tuscany to his candidacy blocked Carpegna's election.

Incapacitated in 1707 by a stroke, he died on 6 April 1714 at the age of eighty-nine, and was buried in the family tomb in Santa Maria in Vallicella.

Episcopal succession

References

1625 births
1714 deaths
18th-century Italian cardinals
17th-century Italian cardinals